Reinhold Feichter (born 11 June 1952) is an Austrian cross-country skier. He competed in the men's 30 kilometre event at the 1976 Winter Olympics.

References

1952 births
Living people
Austrian male cross-country skiers
Olympic cross-country skiers of Austria
Cross-country skiers at the 1976 Winter Olympics
Place of birth missing (living people)